Kutak-e Pain (also Romanized as Kūtak-e Pā’īn; also known as Kūtak) is a village in Nakhlestan Rural District, in the Central District of Kahnuj County, Kerman Province, Iran. At the 2006 census, its population was 1,149, in 245 families.

References 

Populated places in Kahnuj County